If It Wasn't For You is the debut studio album by American country music singer and songwriter Caylee Hammack, released on August 14, 2020, through Capitol Nashville. Hammack co-wrote all the songs and co-produced the album with Mikey Reaves and Connor Thuotte.

Track listing

Release history

References

2020 debut albums
Capitol Records Nashville albums